City commission government is a form of local government in the United States. In a city commission government, voters elect a small commission, typically of five to seven members, typically on a plurality-at-large voting basis.

These commissioners constitute the legislative body of the city and, as a group, are responsible for taxation, appropriations, ordinances, and other general functions. Individual commissioners are also assigned executive responsibility for a specific aspect of municipal affairs, such as public works, finance, or public safety. This form of government thus blends legislative and executive branch functions in the same body.

One commissioner may be designated to function as mayor, but this largely is an honorific or ceremonial designation. The mayor principally serves as chairman or president of the commission, and typically does not have additional powers over and above the other commissioners. Chairing meetings is the principal role. Such a mayor is in many ways similar to the weak mayor form of mayor–council government, but without any direct election for the office. However, some cities with this form of government, such as Portland, Oregon and Bismarck, North Dakota, have an elected mayor.

History
This form of government originated in Galveston, Texas as a response to the Galveston Hurricane of 1900, mainly for the reason that extra support was needed in certain areas. After its constitutionality was tested and confirmed, this form of government quickly became popular across the state of Texas and spread to other parts of the United States.

Des Moines, Iowa became the first city outside Texas to adopt this form.

University of Chicago Professor Charles Zueblin was a major advocate of the commission plan of government, believing that every city in the United States would eventually adopt it. Zueblin also predicted that the system would eventually replace the United States Senate and House of Representatives. He believed the commission system would allow better lawmakers to be selected and that they would be subject to higher scrutiny.

Of the 30 most populous cities in the United States, Portland is the only city with a commission government. A measure to change to the council-manager form of government was defeated 76%-24% on the May 2007 ballot. A 2022 ballot measure to replace it with a council-manager passed with 57% of the vote.

As a form, commission government once was common, but has largely been supplanted as many cities that once used it have since switched to the council-manager form of government. Proponents of the council-manager form typically consider the city commission form to be the predecessor of, not the alternative to, the council-manager form of government. The council-manager form of government developed, at least in part, as a response to some perceived limitations of the commission form. In the council-manager form, the elected council exercises the legislative power of the city and appoints a manager, who possesses the executive power. Thus the executive powers, divided among the commissioners in a commission form, are instead concentrated in the manager, who then delegates responsibility to department heads and other staff members. The council-manager form became the preferred alternative for progressive reform, and after World War I, very few cities adopted the commission form and many cities using the commission plan switched to the council-manager form. Galveston itself changed forms in 1960.

See also 
 Mayor–council government
 Council–manager government
 Executive arrangements in England
 Directorial system

References 

Forms of local government
Galveston Hurricane of 1900
Local government in the United States